Liberty Elementary School District is a public school district based in Tulare County, California, United States. It consists of one school, Liberty Elementary, which is a Kindergarten through 8th grade school. The school's population has seen a recent boom due to a new campus and rapid expansion of the city around the new campus. The district surrounds the other districts of Visalia Unified, Sundale, Tulare City, and Oak Valley.

References

External links
 
 Liberty Elementary School
 Liberty Elementary - Great Schools

School districts in Tulare County, California